The Union Cycliste Internationale (UCI) – the governing body of cycling – categorizes teams into three divisions. The first division, consisting of the top 18 teams, is classified as UCI WorldTeams, and competes in the UCI World Tour. The second and third divisions, respectively, are the ProTeams (formerly known as Professional Continental teams) and the Continental teams.

2022 UCI ProTeams 
According to the UCI Rulebook,

ProTeams compete in the UCI Continental Circuits, which are divided into five continental zones: Africa, America, Asia, Europe, and Oceania. Sometimes, teams are also invited to participate in UCI World Tour and UCI ProSeries events, usually through wildcard invitations, although they are not eligible to win points in the World Tour rankings.

2022 UCI Continental teams 
According to the UCI Rulebook,

Continental teams, the third division of the UCI cycling pyramid, compete almost exclusively in the UCI Continental Circuits while sometimes getting wildcard invitations to UCI ProSeries events as well.

Notes

References 

2022
2022 in men's road cycling